The Aleppo School was a school of icon-painting, founded by the priest Yusuf al-Musawwir (also known as Joseph the Painter) and active in Aleppo, which was then a part of the Ottoman Empire, between at least 1645 and 1777. As explained by William Lyster,

[al-Musawwir's] atelier drew upon the icon tradition of Crete, which before its conquest by the Ottomans in 1699 was the "hub of a great intermingling of Western and Eastern Christian representations."

The Last Judgement, painted by Nehmatallah Hovsep in 1703, is one of the most famous icons of the Aleppo School.

References

Sources
 
 

Aleppo
Icon-painting schools